KLIC may refer to:

 KLIC (AM), a defunct radio station (1230 AM) licensed to serve Richwood, Louisiana, United States
 Klíč (mountain), a peak of the Lusatian Mountains
 The Key (1971 film), a 1971 Czech film
 Kulicke & Soffa Industries
 Kullback–Leibler divergence
 Klic, former stage name of the British House music artist Medlar

People 
 Karel Klíč (1841–1926), Czech painter, photographer and illustrator
 Sandro Klić (born 1981), Croatian footballer